Floyd Sherman Chalmers,  (September 14, 1898 – April 26, 1993) was a Canadian editor, publisher and philanthropist.

Born in Chicago, Illinois, to Canadian parents he was raised in Orillia and Toronto, Ontario. He worked for the Bank of Nova Scotia before serving with the First Canadian Tank Battalion during World War I. He first established his subsequent career in publishing as editor of the battalion's newsletter, and joined the Financial Post as a reporter in 1919.

Appointed chief editor of the Financial Post in 1925,<ref name=publishing>"Publishing Inc. on the move". The Globe and Mail, April 9, 1983.</ref> he later became president of Maclean-Hunter from 1952 to 1964 and chairman of the board until 1969.

From 1968 to 1973, he was appointed chancellor of York University. As a philanthropist, he served on the board of the Toronto Conservatory of Music; endowed the Floyd S. Chalmers Canadian Play Awards, one of Canada's most prominent literary awards for playwrights; and created the Encyclopedia of Music in Canada.

He wrote Codes for Canada (1934), A Gentleman of the Press (1969), a biography of John Bayne Maclean, and Both Sides of the Street: One Man’s Life in Business and the Arts in Canada'' (1983), an autobiography.

In 1967 he was made an Officer of the Order of Canada and was promoted to Companion in 1984.

References

1898 births
1993 deaths
Businesspeople from Toronto
Canadian philanthropists
Canadian biographers
Canadian male non-fiction writers
Male biographers
Canadian autobiographers
Chancellors of York University
Companions of the Order of Canada
Members of the Order of Ontario
Members of the United Church of Canada
American emigrants to Canada
Writers from Toronto
Canadian newspaper editors
Canadian male journalists
20th-century philanthropists